The 1861 Newfoundland general election was held in 1861 to elect members of the 8th General Assembly of Newfoundland in Newfoundland Colony. 14 Conservatives and 12 Liberals were elected. The results in Harbour Grace and Harbour Main electoral districts were set aside following violence at the polls; members were elected in subsequent by-elections. The Liberal Party led by John Kent was defeated by the Conservatives led by Hugh Hoyles; Ambrose Shea replaced Kent as party leader.

Results by party

Elected members
 Twillingate-Fogo
 William V. Whiteway Conservative
 Thomas Knight
 Bonavista Bay
 John H. Warren Conservative
 Matthew W. Walbank
 Stephen March
 Trinity Bay
 Stephen Rendell Conservative
 F.B.T. Carter Conservative (speaker)
 John Winter
 Bay de Verde
 John Bemister Conservative
 Carbonear
 Edmund Hanrahan Liberal
 Harbour Grace (elected later)
 John Hayward Conservative
 Henry J. Moore Conservative
 Brigus-Port de Grave
 John Leamon
 St. John's East
 John Kavanagh
 Robert J. Parsons Liberal
 John Kent Liberal
 St. John's West
 John Casey
 Thomas Talbot
 Henry Renouf
 Harbour Main (election results determined later)
 Thomas Byrne Liberal
 Patrick Nowlan Liberal
 Ferryland
 E. D. Shea Liberal
 Thomas Glen Conservative
 Placentia and St. Mary's
 Richard McGrath
 W. G. Flood
 Pierce M. Barron elected later
 Ambrose Shea Liberal
 Burin
 H. W. Hoyles Conservative
 Edward Evans
 Fortune Bay
 Robert Carter Conservative
 Burgeo-LaPoile
 D. W. Prowse Conservative

References 
 

1861
1861 elections in North America
1861 elections in Canada
Pre-Confederation Newfoundland
1861 in Newfoundland